David Roosevelt Johnson (died October 23, 2004) was a Liberian who led a rebel group during the country's civil war. He was not a member of the Krahn ethnic group he fought for, however his wife was Krahn.

Biography
A former teacher, Johnson joined the rebel group United Liberation Movement of Liberia for Democracy (ULIMO) soon after the war began. ULIMO split into two factions in 1994: United Liberation Movement of Liberia for Democracy-Kromah faction (ULIMO-K) led by Alhaji G.V. Kromah and the United Liberation Movement of Liberia for Democracy-Johnson faction (ULIMO-J), which was led by Johnson.

Johnson had 6 sons in Liberia. Jotham, his eldest, would take care of the rest of his brothers while Johnson had been on rebel missions. Nigel, Justin, Rob, Hye and Igor had lived without knowing much about their father, as Johnson had hardly been home to care for them.

Fighters loyal to Johnson triggered the first major violation of the Abuja Accord in December 1995, resisting ECOMOG deployment around the diamond mines near Tubmanburg. He was dismissed from the ULIMO-J leadership in early 1996.

Like many involved in the Liberian civil war, Johnson was known to use mercenary fighters to further his causes. One notable example was his funding of Joshua Milton Blahyi, commonly known as General Butt Naked. The General commanded a brigade of drunken or otherwise intoxicated young teenage boys who would fight naked or in women's clothing because of a belief that it would protect them from bullets.

In September 1998, Taylor's government accuses Johnson of plotting a coup d'état. Johnson's faction in Monrovia was attacked by President Charles Taylor's security forces, resulting in brutal clashes that saw most of his followers being killed. He managed to flee to the American embassy and Taylor demands that the Americans turn him over for what he guarantees will be a fair trial. But Washington says the assault at the embassy gate makes that promise unreliable.

 where another shootout occurred as Taylor's fighters attempted to prevent him from finding sanctuary on the embassy grounds. Johnson, his son, and his few surviving followers were allowed into the embassy, however, where they were protected by U.S. guards until being evacuated to Ghana.

He eventually relocated to Nigeria. He was charged with treason and convicted in absentia, in April 1999. He died in 2004 in Nigeria, following a protracted period of illness.

References

Bibliography

External links 
Articles at the New York Times
 with Roosevelt Johnson by Stephen McKiernan, Binghamton University Libraries Center for the Study of the 1960s

2004 deaths
Krahn people
Liberian expatriates in Nigeria
Liberian rebels
20th-century Liberian people
21st-century Liberian people
Year of birth missing
Place of birth missing